The MES College Marampally,  is an institute of higher education located in Kerala, India between Aluva and Perumbavoor.  It was founded in 1995 and is managed by Muslim Educational Society and affiliated to Mahatma Gandhi University. The College has been reaccredited by NAAC with A+ Grade (CGPA, 3.38) which is the first ever highest grade in the State as per the revised process of accreditation. The governance and the management of the college are anchored in the principles of Muslim Educational Society (Regd.), Calicut which is one of the largest minority educational agencies in Kerala. The establishment facilitated new directions in the field of higher education by offering a significant number of vocational (Model II) and technical programmes in tune with the demands of job market.

About Muslim Educational Society
Muslim Educational Society was founded in 1964 at Calicut under the tutelage of Dr Abdul Gafoor.

Presently M.E.S. has colleges at Kalladi, Ponnani, Kodungallur, Mambad, Valanchery, Nedumkandam and Marampally. Recently it embarked on a project to start a Medical college at Perinthalmanna.

Academic Programmes

Business Administration
Bachelor of Business Administration (BBA)  	
M.H.R.M.

Computer Applications
Bachelor of Computer Applications (BCA)
M.Sc. Computer Science

Electronics
B.Sc.-Electronics 	
M.Sc.-Electronics

Bioscience
B.Sc. - Biotechnology  	
B.Sc. - Microbiology  	
M.Sc. - Microbiology
M.Sc. - Biochemistry
M.Sc. - Biotechnology (Aided)

Commerce
Bachelor of Commerce (B.Com.)(Computer Applications)
Bachelor of Commerce (B.Com.)(Taxation)   	
Master of Commerce (M.Com.)(Finance)

English
B.A.English
M.A.English

Physics
B.Sc. Physics with computer application
M.Sc. Physics

Mathematics
B.Sc.Mathematics

Arabic
B.A. Arabic

Psychology
B.Sc. Psychology
M.SC. Psychology (aided)

Integrated MSc Programme in Basic Sciences-Chemistry

B.Voc Programmes
Logistics Management
Animation and Graphic design
Fashion design and Management
Software Development and system Administration
Industrial Instrumentation and automation
Advanced course in Multisports and fitness Training
Tourism Administration and Hospitality 

——-

Notable alumni
 Alphonse Puthren, film director
 Krishna Sankar, Indian film actor
 Shabareesh Varma, Indian lyricist

Location
M.E.S. College Marampally is located between the towns of Aluva and Perumbavoor (KSRTC Route).

External links
MES College Marampally Site:

References 

Arts and Science colleges in Kerala
Colleges affiliated to Mahatma Gandhi University, Kerala
Universities and colleges in Kochi
Educational institutions established in 1995
1995 establishments in Kerala
Aluva